Barium sulfite is the inorganic compound with the chemical formula BaSO3. It is a white powder that finds few applications. It is an intermediate in the carbothermal reduction of barium sulfate to barium sulfide:
BaSO4  +  CO  →  BaSO3  +  CO2

References

Barium compounds
Sulfites